Van Helsing: Original Motion Picture Soundtrack was composed by Alan Silvestri and released on May 4, 2004, by Decca Records. The score accompanies the 2004 film, as its name implies.

Track listing

Critical reception
Generally well received by fans and critics alike, three major score-reviewing websites all rated it at four out of five stars. Movie Music UK's Peter Simons says that Silvestri has delivered "what may be the loudest score of the year", but that he "makes this kind of music sound good...[infusing] the score with a textural richness and compositional quality that is quite rare these days". He does admit that "the score is unbelievably loud and hyperactive with virtually no moments of rest", dryly remarking that "a free bottle of aspirin may have been more appropriate" as a freebie than the offered mini poster.

On Soundtrack.net, Dan Goldwasser calls the score "one heck of an album", saying of Transylvania 1887 especially: "It's grand, it's epic, and it's a great start to the album". He also points out that "the sequencing of the album leaves just a little to be desired", bemoaning the scant treatment of the love theme that "factored so heavily in the film".

Filmtracks.com editor Christian Clemmenson praises the score for "allowing the force of a full orchestra and adult choir to set a high standard for summer action once again" and particularly enjoyed the cue Reunited, which he describes as "nothing less than lovely". Like the other two reviewers, he points out the lack of softer underscore on the album, but also finds that Van Helsing's guitar-accompanied theme "sounds remarkably strange in context" and that Silvestri broke a fundamental rule of film scoring by giving the title character the weakest theme. His summary is that "Van Helsing is one monumentally bold and wickedly exciting work", however.

Additional credits
Besides Alan Silvestri, who co-produced the album in addition to composing it, these additional credits are given on the back of the CD cover:

Produced by:
 David Bifano

Orchestrated by:
 Mark McKenzie
 William Ross
 David Slonaker

Special Vocal Performances:
 Deborah Dietrich

Mixed and Recorded by:
 Dennis Sands

Edited by:
 Kenneth Karman

The orchestra used was the Hollywood Studio Orchestra, while the choral sections were provided by the Hollywood Film Chorale.

References

2004 soundtrack albums
2000s film soundtrack albums
Decca Records soundtracks
Alan Silvestri soundtracks
Van Helsing (Universal Pictures franchise)